Robert William Kahler (February 13, 1917 – April 16, 2013) was an American football player and coach. He played defensive back and halfback in the National Football League (NFL) for the Green Bay Packers from 1942 to 1944. Kahler played college football at the University of Nebraska–Lincoln. He retired from playing in 1944.

After military service in World War II, Kahler returned to Nebraska as an assistant football and track coach. In 1947–48, he was the head football and track coach at Nebraska City High School. In 1948, he moved to State Normal School and Teacher's College in Wayne, Nebraska—now Wayne State College—as head football coach and led his team to a share of the Nebraska College Conference championship. The following year, he moved to Northern Illinois University, where he served as head coach for one season in 1955.

Head coaching record

College football

References

External links
 
 

1917 births
2013 deaths
American football defensive backs
American football halfbacks
American soccer coaches
Green Bay Packers players
Nebraska Cornhuskers football coaches
Nebraska Cornhuskers football players
Northern Illinois Huskies football coaches
Northern Illinois Huskies men's soccer coaches
Northern Illinois Huskies wrestling coaches
Wayne State Wildcats football coaches
College men's track and field athletes in the United States
College track and field coaches in the United States
High school football coaches in Nebraska
United States Army Air Forces personnel of World War II
People from Grand Island, Nebraska
Coaches of American football from Nebraska
Players of American football from Nebraska